Geelong West was an electoral district of the Legislative Assembly in the Australian state of Victoria from 1859 to 1985. It was located west of the city of Geelong, defined in the Victorian Electoral Act, 1858 as:

Geelong West (along with Electoral district of Geelong East) was created when the four-member Electoral district of Geelong was abolished in 1859. Geelong West and Geelong East were abolished in 1877, replaced by a re-created 3-member district of Geelong. Geelong West was re-created in 1955.

Members

 Foott died 24 September 1868, replaced by Graham Berry in October 1868.
Johnstone and Berry went on to represent the re-created Geelong from 1877.

Election results

External links
Electoral districts of Geelong West and Geelong, 1956 Map at State Library of Victoria

References

Former electoral districts of Victoria (Australia)
1859 establishments in Australia
1955 establishments in Australia
1877 disestablishments in Australia
1985 disestablishments in Australia